Ribeirão das Neves is a Brazilian municipality located in the state of Minas Gerais. The city belongs to the mesoregion Metropolitana de Belo Horizonte and to the microregion of Belo Horizonte. Most residents commute to Belo Horizonte. The population in 2020 was 338,197.

The city currently has some factories, which strengthen the growth of the municipality, and an increase in trade, with many bars, pizzerias, beauty salons, supermarkets, department stores, several banks as CEF, the Bank of Brazil, Bradesco, Itau, which still houses a small part of the economically active population.

See also
 List of municipalities in Minas Gerais
 Rosaneves

References

External links

Municipalities in Minas Gerais